The Master of the Berswordt Altar (sometimes called the Master of the Crucifixion in the Marienkirche at Dortmund) was a German painter, active in the area around Dortmund during the 14th and 15th centuries.  A number of works around Westphalia, including one in Bielefeld, are attributed to him. His altar is in the Marienkirche, Dortmund.

References

Bibliography
Götz J. Pfeiffer: Meister des Berswordt-Retabels. In: Allgemeines Künstlerlexikon, Bd. 88, Berlin, 2015
Götz J. Pfeiffer: Die Malerei am Niederrhein und in Westfalen um 1400. Der Meister des Berswordt-Retabels und der Stilwandel der Zeit (= Studien zur internationalen Architektur- und Kunstgeschichte. Band 73). Imhof, Petersberg 2009 
Götz J. Pfeiffer: Die Retabelkunst des Meisters des Berswordt-Retabels in Westfalen. In: Uwe Albrecht, Bernd Bünsche (ed.): Das Landkirchener Retabel im Schleswig-Holsteinischen Landesmuseum Schloß Gottorf. Retabelkunst um 1400 in Norddeutschland. Akten des internationalen Kolloquiums am 4. und 5. Oktober 2002 in Schleswig, Schloß Gottorf, pp. 98–112. Ludwig, Kiel 2008 
Götz J. Pfeiffer: "… noch vorzüglicher wie die zwei weiblichen Heiligen…" Werke vom Meister des Berswordt-Retabels mit dem Wildunger Retabel im Vergleich. In: Waldeckischer Geschichtsverein (publ.): Geschichtsblätter für Waldeck. Band 96, 2008, pp. 10–31 ISSN 0342-0965
Andrea Zupancic, Thomas Schilp (ed.): Der Berswordt-Meister und die Dortmunder Malerei um 1400. Stadtkultur im Spätmittelalter (= Veröffentlichungen des Stadtarchivs Dortmund. Band 18). Verlag für Regionalgeschichte, Bielefeld 2002 
Konrad Lorenz, Presbyterium der Evangelischen St.-Mariengemeinde (publ.): Die Evangelische St.-Marienkirche zu Dortmund. Evangelische St.-Mariengemeinde, Dortmund 1981 DNB 810986558, LCCN 82-166117, OCLC 174485875 (published on the occasion of the 800th anniversary)

14th-century German painters
15th-century German painters
Berswordt Altar, Master of the